Takashi Tanoue (30 April 1947 – 19 February 2009) was a Japanese wrestler who competed in the 1972 Summer Olympics, placing 5th overall in the Greco-Roman event.

Early life

References

External links
 

1947 births
2009 deaths
Olympic wrestlers of Japan
Wrestlers at the 1972 Summer Olympics
Japanese male sport wrestlers
People from Yatsushiro, Kumamoto
Sportspeople from Kumamoto Prefecture
World Wrestling Championships medalists